Beck is a Japanese manga series written an illustrated by Harold Sakuishi that has been translated into several languages and spawned a small media franchise. It tells the story of a group of Japanese teenagers who form a rock band and their struggle to fame, focusing on 14-year-old Yukio "Koyuki" Tanaka, who until meeting guitar prodigy Ryusuke Minami was an average teen with a boring life. The series was originally published in monthly chapters in Monthly Shōnen Magazine from 1999 to April 5, 2008. A special 77-page side-story was later published in the magazine's October 2008 issue. The chapters and side-story were combined into 34 tankōbon volumes by Kodansha, which were published from February 17, 2000 to October 17, 2008.

Beck was licensed for an English-language release in North America by Tokyopop. Tokyopop's German branch published a German-language version. In January 2009, it was announced that Kodansha let all of Tokyopop's German licenses expire, thus including Beck. This subsequently led to Tokyopop's English license of Beck expiring as well, after only 12 volumes were published. In July 2018, ComiXology began releasing the series digitally. They released the first fourteen volumes simultaneously on July 5, volumes 15 through 22 on October 2, and volumes 23 through 34 on February 27, 2019. The series has been released in French, Italian, Korean and Chinese, by Delcourt/Akata, Dynit, Haksan Culture Company and Tong Li Publishing respectively.

Volume list

References

External links

Beck